The men's sprint (or "scratch race") at the 1952 Summer Olympics in Helsinki, Finland was held from July 28 to July 31, 1952. There were 27 participants from 27 nations, with each nation limited to a single cyclist. The event was won by Enzo Sacchi of Italy, the nation's second consecutive victory in the men's sprint. Lionel Cox's silver was Australia's first medal in the event. Werner Potzernheim of Germany took bronze.

Background

This was the 10th appearance of the event, which has been held at every Summer Olympics except 1904 and 1912. None of the semifinalists from 1948 returned. The heavy favorite was Enzo Sacchi, the reigning world champion. The man who would have been his biggest competitor, Russell Mockridge of Australia, competed only in the track time trial and tandem.

Finland, Guatemala, Jamaica, Japan, Romania, and the Soviet Union each made their debut in the men's sprint. France made its 10th appearance, the only nation to have competed at every appearance of the event.

Competition format

This track cycling event consisted of numerous rounds: four main rounds and three repechages. Each race involved the riders starting simultaneously and next to each other, from a standing start. Because the early part of races tend to be slow-paced and highly tactical, only the time for the last 200 metres of the one-kilometre race is typically recorded.

The trend in the Olympic sprint competition was toward expansion of a best-of-three match format (beginning in 1932 for the final, expanding in 1936 and 1948 to more rounds); the 1952 edition bucked that trend by returning to an entirely single-race format for the first time since 1928. It also used races with up to five cyclists, where other recent Games had limited individuals races to two or three competitors. A repechage was used after each round instead of only early rounds; late-round races featured three cyclists instead of the head-to-head format that had become common. This also meant that there was no bronze medal match.

The first round consisted of eight heats of three or four cyclists each; the winner of each heat advanced to the quarterfinals while all others were sent to the first repechage. The first repechage had four heats, one of four cyclists and three of five cyclists (though in one of these heats only three men started); again, the winner advanced to the quarterfinals, but this time all others were eliminated. The 12 quarterfinalists competed in four heats of three cyclists each; winners advanced to the semifinals while second and third place cyclists went to the second repechage. The second repechage had two heats of four cyclists each; the winner advanced to the semifinals while the others were all eliminated. With six semifinalists, the semifinals consisted of two heats of three men each. Once again, the winner of each heat advanced while others were sent to a third repechage. The third repechage was a single race of the four semifinal losers, with the winner advancing to the final. The final featured the remaining three riders.

Records

The records for the sprint are 200 metre flying time trial records, kept for the qualifying round in later Games as well as for the finish of races.

* World records were not tracked by the UCI until 1954.

Cyril Peacock broke the Olympic record with 11.7 seconds in the sixth heat of round 1. Werner Potzernheim matched that in the first heat of the first repechage; John Millman did the same in the third heat. Peacock recorded the same time again in the second quarterfinal. Potzernheim bettered that time in the fourth quarterfinal, finishing the last 200 metres in 11.6 seconds. Lionel Cox matched that time in the second semifinal, with Potzernheim tying it again in the third repechage.

Schedule

All times are Eastern European Summer Time (UTC+3)

Results

Round 1

Round 1 heat 1

Round 1 heat 2

Round 1 heat 3

Round 1 heat 4

Round 1 heat 5

Round 1 heat 6

Round 1 heat 7

Round 1 heat 8

First repechage

First repechage heat 1

First repechage heat 2

First repechage heat 3

First repechage heat 4

Quarterfinals

Quarterfinal 1

Quarterfinal 2

Quarterfinal 3

Quarterfinal 4

Second repechage

Second repechage heat 1

Second repechage heat 2

A crash in the original race of this heat resulted in a re-run. Giménez had the lead with Martens on his outside; Lenormand hit Martens's back wheel while trying to pass him. Lenormand had to be taken to the hospital for his injuries and could not compete in the re-run. Martens was able to race, but was hampered by his injuries.

 Original

 Re-run

Semifinals

Semifinal 1

Semifinal 2

Third repechage

Final

Final classification

References

External links
 Official Report

S
Cycling at the Summer Olympics – Men's sprint
Track cycling at the 1952 Summer Olympics